Nicolas Colombel (c. 1644 – 1717) was a French painter, much influenced by Poussin.

Life

Colombel was born at Sotteville, near Rouen, in about 1644. He went to Rome when quite young, and remained there until 1692, forming his style by a study of the works of Raphael and  Nicolas Poussin. His pictures met with considerable success, but most later critics  dismissed him as a mere imitator of Poussin.

He was admitted into the Academy of St Luke at Rome in 1686, and in 1694 into that of Paris. The Louvre possesses the Mars and Rhea Sylvia, which he painted for his reception to the Academy,  and a work representing the Saint Hyacinth Saving the Statue of the Virgin from the Enemies of the Name of Christ . He was employed by Louis XIV at  both Versailles and  Meudon. Many of his works were engraved by Dufloc, and by Michel Dossier. He died in Paris in 1717.

Sir Edmund Head, writing in 1848, described Colombel as "in some sense a master who stood alone among his contemporaries in dignity of feeling, and in the solid character of his art." More recently, Didier Rykner has described his work as "generally easy to recognise", adding "[Colombel] does indeed have his own style, consisting in a gentle Classicism, at times a bit affected, a fondness for subtle and porcelain-like colors, deep blues (close to Sassoferrato)." A considerable number of paintings have been attributed to Colombel in recent years, including an altarpiece,  Saint Dominic Presenting the Dominican Order to Christ, in the collection of the Musée des Beaux-Arts in Grenoble, identified in 2000. An exhibition of Colombel's work was held between November 2012  and February 2013  at the Musée des Beaux-Arts in Rouen.

References and sources
References

Sources

Attribution:
 

1644 births
1717 deaths
People from Seine-Maritime
17th-century French painters
French male painters
18th-century French painters
Painters from Paris
Painters from Rome
18th-century French male artists